Luis Miguel Afonso Fernandes (born 6 October 1989), known as Pizzi, is a Portuguese professional footballer who plays as a central midfielder for Primeira Liga club S.C. Braga.

After a successful loan at Paços de Ferreira, he spent three years in Spain with as many teams, totalling 74 games and 12 goals in La Liga. A versatile and goal-scoring midfielder, mainly operating in the central or right-wing midfield roles, he then spent a total of eight seasons for Benfica, making 360 appearances, scoring 93 goals and winning ten domestic honours including four Primeira Liga titles, three of which consecutively.

Pizzi made his senior international debut for Portugal in 2012 and was part of their squad at the 2017 Confederations Cup and 2018–19 UEFA Nations League, winning the latter tournament.

Club career

Early years
Born in Bragança, Pizzi earned his nickname from playing as a child in a replica FC Barcelona jersey when Juan Antonio Pizzi was the Spanish club's striker. He began his career with hometown club G.D. Braganca in the third tier in 2007. A year later, he joined Primeira Liga club S.C. Braga, spending most of his time out on loan and making his first professional appearances with S.C. Covilhã of the Segunda Liga in 2009. On 10 January 2010, he joined top-flight club F.C. Paços de Ferreira.

In 2010–11, Pizzi scored seven league goals for Paços, only missing three league matches. On 8 May 2011 he netted a hat-trick in a 3–3 draw at Porto, which turned out to be the only home league game that the eventual champions failed to win during the season. He scored twice on 3 March in a 4–3 win at C.D. Nacional to qualify the team for the 2011 Taça da Liga Final.

Spain

On 30 August 2011 Pizzi moved to Spanish team Atlético Madrid, on loan until the end of the year, after which the Colchoneros had an option to buy the player permanently for €13.5 million, which they did in October of the following year. He made his La Liga debut on 18 September 2011, replacing also newly signed Radamel Falcao midway through the second half of a 4–0 home win against Racing de Santander. He scored his only Atlético goal to open a 3–2 win over Levante UD also at the Vicente Calderón Stadium on 20 November, totalling 15 appearances of which three were in the victorious UEFA Europa League campaign.

Along with several compatriots, initially still under contract with Braga, Pizzi moved to Deportivo de La Coruña for the 2012–13 campaign. In only his second appearance, through a penalty kick, he helped the Galicians come back from 1–3 at Valencia CF for a final 3–3 draw, scoring his team's last goal; he added a brace against FC Barcelona on 20 October 2012 – one of the goals coming through a free kick – but his team lost 4–5 at the Riazor Stadium.

On 26 July 2013 Pizzi signed a six-year contract with S.L. Benfica, for a fee of €6 million for half of his economic rights, being immediately loaned to RCD Espanyol also in Spain's top flight.

Benfica
In the 2014–15 season, Pizzi joined Portuguese champions Benfica and was converted from winger to central midfielder, like his predecessor Enzo Pérez. On 5 October 2014, Pizzi debuted in a 4–0 win against Arouca in Primeira Liga. On 14 January 2015, Pizzi scored his first goal for Benfica, from a penalty kick, in another 4–0 home win against Arouca, this time in the third round of league cup. On 28 February, Pizzi scored his first goal for Benfica in the league, in the thrashing of Estoril (6–0).

Pizzi scored 12 times in 48 games over the 2016–17 season as Benfica won a domestic double. He was voted Player of the Month consecutively from October/November to December, and eventually Player of the Season at the LPFP Awards.

On 1 December 2017, during the Porto vs Benfica match, Pizzi was attacked in the back by a supporter of Porto who invaded the pitch; Porto faced a maximum of two behind closed doors matches but was only fined €2,860.

On 10 August 2018, Pizzi scored a first-half hat-trick in a 3–2 home win over Vitória de Guimarães in the opening (league) match of the 2018–19 season, and was again voted Player of the Month for August 2018. He scored 15 goals and made 23 assists in 55 matches overall that season as Benfica regained the league title, and at its conclusion he signed a new contract until 2023.

Pizzi scored twice in the 2019 Supertaça Cândido de Oliveira on 4 August, a 5–0 win over city rivals Sporting CP at the Estádio Algarve. By scoring twice on 14 December in a 4–0 win over F.C. Famalicão he had recorded 16 goals for the season, 11 of which in the league, making it already his highest-scoring season. He ended the season with 18, joint-best alongside teammate Carlos Vinícius and Rio Ave's Mehdi Taremi.

On 16 December 2020, Pizzi made his 300th Benfica appearance in a penalty shootout win over Vitória de Guimarães in the league cup quarter-finals; he scored a late spot-kick to draw the game 1–1. The following 23 November, he reached 350 games when he came on as a substitute in a goalless draw at FC Barcelona in the Champions League group stage; he was used more often from the bench in the 2021–22 season.

On 8 February 2022, Pizzi was loaned to İstanbul Başakşehir F.K. until the end of the Turkish Süper Lig season. He scored his only goal on his debut four days later, opening a 2–0 home win over Gaziantep FK.

Al Wahda 
In the summer of 2022, Pizzi was not in the plans of new Benfica manager Roger Schmidt and was courted by several Middle Eastern clubs; he signed for Al Wahda FC of the UAE Pro League under compatriot manager Carlos Carvalhal as they offered him a two-year contract worth a net amount of €2 million per year.

Braga 
On 30 January 2023, Pizzi returned to Portugal's top flight, having rescinded his contract with Al Wahda to join Braga.

International career
Pizzi made his debut for Portugal on 14 November 2012 in a friendly with Gabon, scoring through a penalty in an eventual 2–2 draw in Libreville.

He was selected for the 2017 FIFA Confederations Cup in Russia, playing two matches as the Portuguese finished third.

Career statistics

Club

International

Scores and results list Portugal's goal tally first, score column indicates score after each Pizzi goal.

Honours
Paços de Ferreira
Taça da Liga runner-up: 2010–11

Atlético de Madrid
UEFA Europa League: 2011–12

Benfica
Primeira Liga: 2014–15, 2015–16, 2016–17, 2018–19
Taça de Portugal: 2016–17; runner-up: 2020–21
Taça da Liga: 2014–15, 2015–16
Supertaça Cândido de Oliveira: 2016, 2017, 2019

Portugal
UEFA Nations League: 2018–19
FIFA Confederations Cup third place: 2017

Individual
Primeira Liga Player of the Month: October/November 2016, December 2016, August 2018, August 2019
SJPF Primeira Liga Team of the Year: 2016, 2017
Primeira Liga Player of the Year: 2016–17
UEFA Primeira Liga Best Player: 2018–19
Primeira Liga Top scorer: 2019–20
UEFA Europa League top scorer: 2020–21 (joint – 7 goals)

References

External links

 
 National team data 
 

1989 births
Living people
People from Bragança, Portugal
Sportspeople from Bragança District
Portuguese footballers
Association football midfielders
GD Bragança players
S.C. Braga players
G.D. Ribeirão players
S.C. Covilhã players
F.C. Paços de Ferreira players
Atlético Madrid footballers
Deportivo de La Coruña players
S.L. Benfica footballers
RCD Espanyol footballers
İstanbul Başakşehir F.K. players
Al Wahda FC players
Segunda Divisão players
Liga Portugal 2 players
Primeira Liga players
La Liga players
Süper Lig players
UAE Pro League players
Portugal youth international footballers
Portugal under-21 international footballers
Portugal international footballers
2017 FIFA Confederations Cup players
UEFA Nations League-winning players
Portuguese expatriate footballers
Portuguese expatriate sportspeople in Spain
Expatriate footballers in Spain
Portuguese expatriate sportspeople in Turkey
Expatriate footballers in Turkey
Portuguese expatriate sportspeople in the United Arab Emirates
Expatriate footballers in the United Arab Emirates